Roxette Live: Traveling the World is the first and only live album by Swedish pop duo Roxette, released on 6 December 2013 by Parlophone in conjunction with Warner Music. The set consists of recordings derived from three separate performances of the 2012 South American leg of "The Neverending World Tour". The music album contains their 5 May concert at the Teatro Caupolicán in Santiago, Chile in its entirety, while the DVD and Blu-ray also contains songs taken from their performances at the Orfeo Superdomo in Córdoba, Argentina on 3 May and the Teatro Positivo in Curitiba, Brazil on 8 May. Also included on the DVD/Blu-ray is an exclusive documentary, "It All Begins Where It Ends – The Incredible Story of Roxette".

Critical reception
Malaysian newspaper The Star gave the set a positive review, saying that "At 55, Marie Fredriksson may not sound like how she used to anymore", but that longtime fans would be pleased with her "energetic performance ... it's good to know that she hasn't lost her mojo." They praised the performance of "It Must Have Been Love" as the album's best song, saying that Fredriksson "lets the audience sing the song for her before launching into a rocking performance of her own." Swedish publication Aftonbladet was also positive, rating the album three out of five.

Formats and track listings
All songs written by Per Gessle, except "Perfect Day", "Spending My Time" and "Listen to Your Heart" by Gessle and Mats Persson.

Credits and personnel
Credits adapted from the liner notes of Roxette Live: Travelling the World.

 Roxette are Per Gessle and Marie Fredriksson.
 Recorded at Orfeo Superdomo in Córdoba on 3 May 2012, Teatro Caupolicán in Santiago on 5 May 2012, and Teatro Positivo in Curitiba on 8 May 2012.
 All songs mixed by Christoffer Lundquist at The Aerosol Grey Machine.
 Mastered by Mats Lindfors at Cutting Room Studios in Stockholm.

Musicians
 Marie Fredriksson – lead and backing vocals
 Per Gessle – lead and backing vocals, rhythm guitar, harmonica
 Per "Pelle" Alsing – drums and percussion
 Magnus Börjeson – bass and backing vocals
 Dea Norberg – backing vocals and percussion
 Christoffer Lundquist – lead guitar and backing vocals
 Clarence Öfwerman – keyboards and backing vocals

Production
 Justyna Bereza – photography
 Josefin Bolyos – photography
 Kai-Uwe Heinze – photography
 Mattias Holmer – producer 
 Svante Larsson – producer 
 Lucas Lindholm – photography
 Magnus Öhrlund – director and producer 
 Mikael Sandberg – director

Charts

Album charts

Video charts

References

External links

2013 live albums
Roxette albums